Gary Owen (born 7 July 1958) is an English retired football midfielder. With 22 caps, he is one of the most capped players for England Under-21s, but never made it into the senior team. He was also capped seven times for England B. With the under-21s he won the 1982 UEFA European Under-21 Football Championship, in which he scored two goals in the final against West Germany.

Professional career
Owen started his career with Manchester City, with whom he turned professional in 1975 and made his debut aged 17, against Wolverhampton Wanderers in March 1976. After winning the League Cup earlier in the year, in October 1976 Owen scored his first goal, against West Ham United.

In 1979 Owen was sold, as part of City manager Malcolm Allison's clear-out, to West Bromwich Albion for £450,000*, despite being a strong fans' favourite. At Albion, he was a regular, and although a midfielder, was awarded the number 10 shirt usually reserved for a striker, and he was also the club's first choice penalty-taker.

He suffered two broken ankles and meningitis in the 1984–85 season, and the following year, 1985–86, lost his place in the side due to his injuries. West Bromwich were relegated, and Owen joined Panionios in Greece for 1986–87. For the 1987–88 season he returned to England for a year with Sheffield Wednesday. He ended his career in season 1988–89 with APOEL in Cyprus. Before going to Cyprus, he also played two games for Swedish club Hammarby IF in 1988. It was two away games against Malmö FF and Örgryte IS for a total of 157 minutes.

Post Playing
Owen worked as a journalist in Manchester, providing opinion on Manchester City in the Manchester Evening News and on local radio station, Century FM. He also has an art dealership, "Gary Owen Fine Art".

(*) According to some sources, the fee was £550,000.

References
Gary Owen Manchester City biography at Sporting-Heroes.net
Gary Owen West Bromwich Albion biography at Sporting-Heroes.net
Gary Owen biography as part of a Manchester City fansite

1958 births
Living people
Allsvenskan players
APOEL FC players
Association football midfielders
Cypriot First Division players
England B international footballers
England under-21 international footballers
English columnists
English expatriate footballers
English footballers
Expatriate footballers in Cyprus
Expatriate footballers in Greece
Expatriate footballers in Sweden
Footballers from St Helens, Merseyside
Hammarby Fotboll players
Manchester City F.C. players
Panionios F.C. players
Sheffield Wednesday F.C. players
Super League Greece players
West Bromwich Albion F.C. players
Writers from Manchester